Arden on the Severn is a census-designated place (CDP) in Anne Arundel County, Maryland. The population was 1,880 at the 2020 census. Its homes offer residents private waterfront beaches including private docks and boat slips as well as access to four private community beaches.  

The homes in Arden on the Severn are considered to be amongst some of the most sought after residential properties in the State of Maryland, as the community is secluded from main roads and business, but is close enough to the main highways offering residents easy commuting routes with low amounts of traffic to the Washington, D.C., Annapolis, and Baltimore metro areas.

Geography
Arden on the Severn is located at  (39.071009, −76.590347).

History
According to the town center in Arden on the Severn, the area was used in the past for mining and cultivation. It developed into a community as the miners and cultivators remained close to and resided in the areas by the mines, especially areas closest to the beaches. There has been an ongoing search for a rowdy rebel ever since the early 1800s. A vintage wanted poster exists and is widely circulated.

Demographics

As of the census of 2020, published in 2021, there were 1,880 people, 714 households, and 557 families residing in the city.

The racial makeup of the city was 95.08% White, 1.93% African American, 0.51% Native American, 0.30% Asian, 0.05% Pacific Islander, 0.41% from other races, and 1.73% from two or more races. Hispanic or Latino of any race were 1.73% of the population. 97.77% of the population are natives born in the United States, with 2.23% of the resident's being naturalized citizens born in other countries. 

The average income for a household as of the 2020 census was $147,497 for households, and $166,282 for families. 

The average home price in 2021 was $821,262, ranging from $571,241 to $3,329,000. Homes in the community are primarily waterfront properties which include private docks, boat slips and beaches. 

There were 714 households, out of which 32.1% had children under the age of 18 living with them, 66.6% were married couples living together, 6.1% had a female householder with no husband present, and 24.5% were non-families. 18.4% of all households were made up of individuals, and 4.7% had someone living alone who was 65 years of age or older. The average household size was 2.67 and the average family size was 3.04.

In the CDP, the population was spread out, with 22.9% under the age of 18, 6.2% from 18 to 24, 30.4% from 25 to 44, 32.0% from 45 to 64, and 8.4% who were 65 years of age or older. The median age was 40 years. For every 100 females, there were 109.0 males. For every 100 females age 18 and over, there were 102.8 males.

Community
Most of the children in the community attend Old Mill School nearby private schools, including Indian Creek.  

There are a total of four private community-sponsored beaches in the town, including Kayak Beach which offers residents dry docked storage for Kayaks and Scull Boats. 

Homes in Arden on the Severn directly overlook The Severn River from the east to the west, and offer residents direct access to Annapolis by either boat or car in under 10 minutes. 

Crabbing is a popular activity among residents, each household is permitted to use up to three crab traps per property during the crabbing season which runs from May to late October. Residents can typically trap between 5-7 Maryland Blue Crabs per day using cage traps and bait, and store trapped crabs in a separate holding cage. 

Many residents dock both powered and sail boats as well as jet skis.

References

External links
 Arden on the Severn community website

Census-designated places in Maryland
Census-designated places in Anne Arundel County, Maryland